Year 1119 (MCXIX) was a common year starting on Wednesday (link will display the full calendar) of the Julian calendar.

Events 
 By place 

 Levant 
 June 28 – Battle of Ager Sanguinis: The Crusader army of the Principality of Antioch under Roger of Salerno is ambushed and annihilated (near Sarmada) by the combined Muslim forces (20,000 men) of Ilghazi, the Artuqid ruler of Aleppo. Muslim troops are sent to raid the suburbs of Antioch and sack the port of Saint Symeon.  The Crusader fortresses at Atarib, Zardana, Sarmin, Ma'arrat al-Nu'man and Kafr Tab are captured. Ilghazi makes a triumphant entry at Aleppo, Crusader prisoners are dragged in chains – where they are tortured to death in the streets. The massacre leads to the name of the battle, Ager Sanguinis (or "the Field of Death").
 August 14 – Battle of Hab: The Crusaders under King Baldwin II of Jerusalem (supported by forces of Count Pons of Tripoli) defeat Ilghazi's army at Ariha in Syria. Baldwin manages to re-capture all of the Crusader castles and returns to Antioch in triumph. He stabilizes the frontiers and prevents Ilghazi from marching on Antioch.
 Autumn – Hugh de Payns founds the monastic order of the Knights Templar and becomes the first Grand Master. In association with Bernard of Clairvaux, a French abbot and religious leader, he creates the Latin Rule, the code of behavior of the Order. The Templars get the primary task to protect the pilgrime-routes in Palestine.

 Europe 
 August 20 – Battle of Brémule: King Henry I of England defeats King Louis VI (the Fat) of France and his 400 knights in Normandy. A skirmish that begins with the French launching a fierce but disordered attack, and ends with the French turning tail. Louis agrees to make peace and formally recognizes William Adelin as duke of Normandy.

 England 
 Robert I (de Brus), 1st Lord of Annandale, grants and confirms the church of St. Hilda of Middlesbrough to Whitby.
 September 19 – A severe earthquake hits Gloucestershire and Warwickshire.

 By topic 

 Religion 
 January 29 – Pope Gelasius II dies in exile after a 1-year pontificate at the Abbey of Cluny. He is succeeded by Callixtus II as the 162nd pope of the Catholic Church.
 March – Olegarius Bonestruga, archbishop of Tarragona, preaches successfully a Crusade against the Moors in Catalonia.
 Council of Reims: Callixtus II concludes peace with Henry I. There are 15 archbishops and over 200 bishops present.
 Council of Toulouse: The Catholic Church condemns the Petrobrusian heresy.

 Technology 
 Zhu Yu, a Chinese historian, writes his book Pingzhou Table Talks (published this year), the earliest known use of separate hull compartments in ships. Zhu Yu's book is the first to report the use of a magnetic compass for navigation at sea. Although the first actual description of the magnetic compass is by another Chinese writer Shen Kuo in his Dream Pool Essays (published in 1088).

Births 
 February 28 – Xi Zong, Chinese emperor (d. 1150)
 July 7 – Sutoku, Japanese emperor (d. 1164)
 Ahmed-Al-Kabeer, Arab Sufi teacher (d. 1182)
 Aldebrandus, bishop of Fossombrone (d. 1219)
 Matthias I, duke of Lorraine (approximate date)
 Tancred, Norman nobleman (approximate date)
 William de Warenne, 3rd Earl of Surrey (d. 1148)

Deaths 
 January 29 – Gelasius II, pope of the Catholic Church
 March 10 – Muirchertach Ua Briain, king of Munster
 March 29 – Peter de Honestis, Lombard monk
 June 20 – Henry de Beaumont, 1st Earl of Warwick
 June 27 – Herwig of Meissen, German bishop 
 June 28 – Roger of Salerno, Norman nobleman
 July 17 – Baldwin VII, count of Flanders (b. 1093)
 July 22 – Herbert de Losinga, English bishop
 August 4 – Landulf II, archbishop of Benevento
 September 13 – Gleb Vseslavich, Kievan prince
 October 13 – Alan IV, duke of Brittany (b. 1063)
 Aedh Ua Con Ceannainn, king of Uí Díarmata 
 Geoffrey de Clyve (de Clive), English bishop
 Ibn Aqil, Persian theologian and jurist (b. 1040)
 Johannes of Jerusalem, French abbot (b. 1042)
 Robert the Leper (Leprous), French nobleman
 Wang Ximeng, Chinese painter (b. 1096)

References